In mathematical analysis, a thin set is a subset of n-dimensional complex space Cn with the property that each point has a neighbourhood on which some non-zero holomorphic function vanishes.  Since the set on which a holomorphic function vanishes is closed and has empty interior (by the Identity theorem), a thin set is nowhere dense, and the closure of a thin set is also thin.

The fine topology was introduced in 1940 by Henri Cartan to aid in the study of thin sets.

References

Several complex variables